Research has found that attempted suicide rates and suicidal ideation among lesbian, gay, bisexual, transgender (LGBT) youth are significantly higher than among the general population.

In the United States, one study has shown the passage of laws that discriminate against LGBT people may have significant negative impacts on the physical and mental health and well-being of LGBT youth; for example, depression and drug use among LGBT people have been shown to increase significantly after the passage of discriminatory laws. By contrast, the passage of laws that recognize LGBT people as equal with regard to civil rights, such as laws supporting same-sex marriage, may have significant positive impacts on the physical and mental health and well-being of LGBT youth. 

Bullying of LGBT youth is a contributing factor in many suicides, even if not all of the attacks have been specifically regarding sexuality or gender. Since a series of suicides in the early 2000s, more attention has been focused on the issues and underlying causes in an effort to reduce suicides among LGBT youth. Research by the Family Acceptance Project has demonstrated that "parental acceptance, and even neutrality, with regard to a child's sexual orientation" can bring down the attempted suicide rate.

Reports and studies

Clinical social worker Caitlin Ryan's Family Acceptance Project (San Francisco State University) conducted the first study of the effect of family acceptance and rejection on the health, mental health, and well-being of LGBT youth, including suicide, HIV/AIDS, and homelessness. Their research shows that LGBT youths "who experience high levels of rejection from their families during adolescence (when compared with those young people who experienced little or no rejection from parents and caregivers) were more than eight times [more] likely to have attempted suicide, more than six times likely to report high levels of depression, more than three times likely to use illegal drugs, and more than three times likely to be at high risk for HIV or other STDs" by the time they reach their early 20s.

Numerous studies have shown that lesbian, gay, and bisexual youth have a higher rate of suicide attempts than do heterosexual youth.  The Suicide Prevention Resource Center estimated that between 5 and 10% of LGBT youth, depending on age and sex groups, have attempted suicide, a rate 1.5-3 times higher than heterosexual youth. This higher prevalence of suicidal ideation and overall mental health problems among gay teenagers compared to their heterosexual peers has been attributed to minority stress. 

Parents with higher levels of education or belonging to different ethnicities do not seem to provide significant impact on LGBT+ suicide statistics.

In terms of school climate, "approximately 25 percent of lesbian, gay and bisexual students and university employees have been harassed due to their sexual orientation, as well as a third of those who identify as transgender, according to the study and reported by the Chronicle of Higher Education." Research has found the presence of gay–straight alliances (GSAs) in schools is associated with decreased suicide attempts; in a study of LGBT youth, ages 13–22, 16.9% of youth who attended schools with GSAs attempted suicide versus 33.1% of students who attended schools without GSAs.

"LGBT students are three times as likely as non-LGBT students to say that they do not feel safe at school (22% vs. 7%) and 90% of LGBT students (vs. 62% of non-LGBT teens) have been harassed or assaulted during the past year."  

An international study found that suicidal LGBT people showed important differences with suicidal heterosexuals, in a matched-pairs study. That study found suicidal LGBT people were more likely to communicate suicidal intentions, to search for new friends online, and to find more support online than did suicidal heterosexuals.

The black transgender and gender non-conforming community has been found to face discrimination to a higher degree than the rest of the transgender community, which is due to the intersection of racism and transphobia.  Research has found that this community experiences a higher level of poverty, suicide attempts, and harassment, while the effects of HIV  and being refused health care due to transphobia and/or racism are greater as well. 

A survey by the National LGBTQ task force found that amongst the black respondents 49% reported having attempted suicide. Additional findings were that this group reported that 26% are unemployed and 34% reported an annual income of less than $10,000 per year. 41% of respondents reported homelessness at some point in their lives, which is more than five times the rate of the general US population. Also, the report revealed that the black transgender or gender non-conforming community reported 20.23% were living with HIV and that half of the respondents who attended school expressing a transgender identity or gender non-conformity reported facing harassment. 27% of black transgender youth reported being physically assaulted, 15% were sexually assaulted and 21% left school due to these instances of harassment. 

A more recent survey by The Trevor Project revealed that 21% of African American LGBT youth have attempted suicide throughout 2021. Amongst Native American youth, 31% of LGBT youth have attempted suicide, and amongst Latin American youth, 18% of survey respondents admitted they have attempted suicide in the past year.

A 2022 study found that the use of gender-affirming hormone therapy in transgender and nonbinary youth was associated with a significant decrease in depression and suicidality.

Familial acceptance 
Familial responses to LGBT youth identities differ from person to person. They range from acceptance to outright rejection of the LGBT individual. "Family connectedness" is important in an LGBT youth's life because it will help establish a positive mental health. One of the negative outcomes of LGBT youth confiding in family members about their sexual identities is the risk of being kicked out of their homes. When these youth don't have the support and acceptance of their family, they are more likely to turn to other riskier sources.

Amongst transgender youth, these effects are even more pronounced. In a sample of 84 transgender youth, those that reported being strongly supported by their parents, had a 93% lower suicide attempt rate (a 14-fold difference). In a separate survey of nearly 34,000 LGBT youth, those with supportive families reported a suicide attempt rate that was less than half of those without supportive families.

Impact of same-sex marriage
Across OECD countries, the legalisation of same-sex marriage is associated with reductions in the suicide rate of youth aged 10–24, with this association persisting into the medium term. The establishment of the legal right of same-sex marriage in the United States is associated with a significant reduction in the rate of attempted suicide among children, with the effect concentrated among children of a minority sexual orientation.

A study of nationwide data from across the United States from January 1999 to December 2015 revealed that the recognition of same-sex marriage is associated with a significant reduction in the rate of attempted suicide among children, with the effect being concentrated among children of a minority sexual orientation (LGBT youth), resulting in approximately 134,000 fewer children attempting suicide each year in the United States. Comparable findings are observed outside the United States. A study using cross-country data from 1991 to 2017 for 36 OECD countries found that same-sex marriage legalization is associated with a decline in youth suicide of 1.191 deaths per 100,000 youth, with this reduction persisting at least into the medium term.

OECD countries 
A study of country-level data across 36 OECD countries from 1991 to 2017 found that same-sex marriage legalization reduced the suicide rate of youth aged 10–24 by 1.191 deaths per 100,000 youth, equal to a 17.90% decrease. This decline was most pronounced in males for whom the suicide rate fell by 1.993 compared to a decrease of 0.348 for female youth, corresponding to decreases of 19.98% and 10.90%, respectively. The study worked by exploiting common factors in the youth suicide rate across time between the sample countries to econometrically estimate what the suicide rate would have been in the absence of same-sex marriage legalization for the countries and years that same-sex marriage was legal. The impact of same-sex marriage legalization could then be inferred by comparing this estimated counterfactual to the observed data across time, thereby enabling inferences to be interpreted causally. By virtue of this design, the researchers were able to establish that the association persisted at least into the medium term and that countries that recently adopted same-sex marriage (the Netherlands was the first country to legalize same-sex marriage in 2001 and, as of 2017, 18 of the 36 sample countries had followed suit) also experienced declines in youth suicide. These findings indicate that future legalization in other developed countries would also engender a decrease in youth suicide over time.

United States 
A study of nationwide data from January 1999 to December 2015 revealed an association between states that established same-sex marriage and reduced rates of attempted suicide among all schoolchildren in grades 9–12, with a rate reduction in all schoolchildren (LGB and non-LGB youth) in grades 9–12 declining by 7% and a rate reduction among schoolchildren of a minority sexual orientation (LGB youth) in grades 9–12 of 14%, resulting in approximately 134,000 fewer children attempting suicide each year in the United States. The gradual manner in which same-sex marriage was established in the United States (expanding from 1 state in 2004 to all 50 states in 2015) allowed the researchers to compare the rate of attempted suicide among children in each state over the time period studied. Once same-sex marriage was established in a particular state, the reduction in the rate of attempted suicide among children in that state became permanent. No reduction in the rate of attempted suicide among children occurred in a particular state until that state recognized same-sex marriage. The lead researcher of the study observed that "laws that have the greatest impact on gay adults may make gay kids feel more hopeful for the future". 

Other research shows that while this nationwide study has shown an association between states that established same-sex marriage and reduced rates of attempted suicide among all schoolchildren in grades 9–12, it does not show causation.
According to Julie Cerel, director of the  Suicide Prevention & Exposure Lab at the University of Kentucky, LGBTQ children "experience much more interpersonal stress from schools, from peers and from home". The Centers for Disease Control and Prevention survey found that more than 1 in 5 young adults (22%) attempted suicide in 2021. Stigma and violence against LGBTQ teens has greatly contributed to their mental health.

Developmental psychology perspectives
The diathesis-stress model suggests that biological vulnerabilities predispose individuals to different conditions such as cancer, heart disease, and mental health conditions like major depression, a risk factor for suicide.  Varying amounts of environmental stress increase the probability that these individuals will develop that condition. Minority stress theory suggests that minority status leads to increased discrimination from the social environment which leads to greater stress and health problems.  In the presence of poor emotion regulation skills this can lead to poor mental health.  Also, the differential susceptibility hypothesis suggests that for some individuals their physical and mental development is highly dependent on their environment in a "for-better-and-for-worse" fashion.  That is, individuals who are highly susceptible will have better than average health in highly supportive environments and significantly worse than average health in hostile, violent environments.  The model can help explain the unique health problems affecting LGBT populations including increased suicide attempts.  For adolescents, the most relevant environments are the family, neighborhood, and school. Adolescent bullying – which is highly prevalent among sexual minority youths – is a chronic stressor that can increase risk for suicide via the diathesis-stress model. In a 2011 study of American lesbian, gay, and bisexual adolescents, Mark Hatzenbuehler found that a more conservative social environment elevated risk in suicidal behavior among all youth and that this effect was stronger for LGB youth.  Furthermore, he found that the social environment partially mediated the relation between LGB status and suicidal behaviour. Hatzenbuehler found that even after such social as well as individual factors were controlled for, however, that "LGB status remained a significant predictor of suicide attempts."

Institutionalized and internalized homophobia
Institutionalized and internalized homophobia may also lead LGBT youth to not accept themselves and have deep internal conflicts about their sexual orientation. Parents may abandon or force children out of home after the child's coming out.

Homophobia arrived at by any means can be a gateway to bullying which can take many forms. Physical bullying is kicking, punching, while emotional bullying is name calling, spreading rumors and other verbal abuse. Cyber bullying involves abusive text messages or messages of the same nature on Facebook, Twitter, also  social media networks. Sexual bullying includes inappropriate touching, lewd gestures or jokes.

Bullying may be considered a "rite of passage", but studies have shown it has negative physical and psychological effects. "Sexual minority youth, or teens that identify themselves as gay, lesbian or bisexual, are bullied two to three times more than heterosexuals", and "almost all transgender students have been verbally harassed (e.g., called names or threatened in the past year at school because of their sexual orientation (89%) and gender expression (89%)") according to Gay, Lesbian and Straight Education Network's Harsh Realities, The Experiences of Transgender Youth In Our Nation’s Schools because most teens are to this day and people hate them for it

Projects
Several NGOs have started initiatives to attempt a reduction of LGBT youth suicides, such as The Trevor Project and the It Gets Better Project. Actions such as Ally Week, Day of Silence, and Suicide intervention have helped to combat both Self-harm and violence against LGBT people.

Policy responses
A number of policy options have been repeatedly proposed to address this issue. Some advocate intervention at the stage in which youth are already suicidal (such as crisis hotlines), while others advocate programs directed at increasing LGBT youth access to factors found to be "protective" against suicide (such as social support networks or mentors).

One proposed option is to provide LGBT-sensitivity and anti-bullying training to current middle and high school counselors and teachers. Citing a study by Jordan et al., school psychologist Anastasia Hansen notes that hearing teachers make homophobic remarks or fail to intervene when students make such remarks are both positively correlated with negative feelings about an LGBT identity.  Conversely, a number of researchers have found the presence of LGBT-supportive school staff to be related to "positive outcomes for LGBT youth". Citing a 2006 Psychology in the Schools report, The Trevor Project notes that "lesbian, gay, bisexual, transgender and questioning (LGBTQ) youth who believe they have just one school staff member with whom they can talk about problems are only 1/3 as likely as those without that support to... report making multiple suicide attempts in the past year."

Another frequently proposed policy option involves providing grant incentives for schools to create and/or support Gay–Straight Alliances, student groups dedicated to providing a social support network for LGBT students. Kosciw and Diaz, researchers for the Gay, Lesbian and Straight Education Network, found in a nationwide survey that "students in schools with a GSA were less likely to feel unsafe, less likely to miss school, and more likely to feel that they belonged at their school than students in schools with no such clubs."  Studies have shown that social isolation and marginalization at school are psychologically damaging to LGBT students, and that GSAs and other similar peer-support group can be effective providers of this "psychosocial support".

Early interventions for LGBT youth

Be proactive and understanding
Educators can be proactive in helping adolescents with gender identity and the questions/issues that sometimes come with them. Normalizing education about sexualities and genders can help prevent adolescents from resorting to suicide, drug abuse, homelessness, and many more psychological problems.  Van Wormer & McKinney (2003) relate that understanding LGBT students is the first step to suicide prevention.  They use a harm reduction approach, which meets students where they are to reduce any continued harm linked with their behaviors.  They relate that creating a supportive and culturally diverse environment is crucial to social acceptance in an educational setting.

LGBT role models/resources
It could be beneficial to hire LGBT teachers to serve as role models and support LGBT students. Many of the resources in the U.S. are crisis-driven- not prevention-driven. In order to prevent suicide for LGBT adolescents, it needs to be the other way around. Furthermore, studies show that counselors and teachers need to be trained in self-awareness, sexuality and sexual diversity with themselves and with students. Researchers also suggest inviting gay/lesbian and bisexual panels from colleges or universities to conduct classroom discussions.  Education and resources is potentially key to helping LGBT students and families. According to researcher Rob Cover, role models and resources benefit LGBT youth only if they avoid replicating stereotypes and provide diverse visual and narrative representations to allow broad identification.

Having a PFLAG (Parents Families, and Friends of Lesbians and Gays) and GSA Club are possible resources to promote discussions and leadership roles to LGBT students.  These resources extend outside of school and in the community.  (Greytak, E. A., Kosciw, J. G., & Boesen, M. J. 2013) report that when schools have a GSA or Gay Straight Alliance club or a club promoting social awareness and camaraderie of sorts, supportive educators, inclusive curricula, and comprehensive policies that LGBT students were victimized less and had more positive school experiences. This would allow LGBT students to be positive and want to be in school.

Teach tolerance and examine a school's climate
Examine a school's climate and teach tolerance – Teaching Tolerance is a movement, magazine and website which gives many tools and ideas to help people be tolerant of one another.  It demonstrates that the classroom is a reflection of the world around us.  Educators can use Teach Tolerance's website and book to download resources and look up creative ways to learn more about LGBT students and teaching tolerance to their students in the classroom.  It helps schools get started with anti-bullying training and professional development and resource suggestions.  It even relates common roadblocks and tips to starting a GSA club.

Research shows that a collaborative effort must be made in order to prevent LGBT students from being bullied and/or committing suicide.  Teachers, administrators, students, families, and communities need to come together to help LGBT students be confident.  Each school has its own individuality, its own sense of "self", whether it be the teachers, administrators, students, or the surrounding community.  In order to tackle the issue of bullying for LGBT students it needs to start with understanding the student population and demographic where the school lies. Educating students, faculty, staff, and school boards on LGBT issues and eliminating homophobia and transphobia in schools, training staff on diversity acceptance and bullying prevention, and implementing Gay–Straight Alliances is key to suicide prevention for LGBT students (Bacon, Laura Ann 2011).  Adolescents grow and are shaped by many factors including internal and external features (Swearer, Espelage, Vaillancourt, & Hymel, 2010).

The school climate must foster respect. Thus, setting the tone for administration, teachers, professionals who enter the building, parents and most importantly the students.  People, in general, need to understand their own misconceptions and stereotypes of what being LGBT is. Unless students and adults are educated on the LGBT community, than stereotypes and negative attitudes will continue to exist (Knotts, G., & Gregorio, D. 2011).  The GMCLA (Gay Men's Chorus of Los Angeles) use music and singing as a vehicle for changing the attitudes and hearts of people in schools nationwide.  Their goal is to bring music to standards-driven curriculum to youth with the purpose of teaching content in innovative and meaningful ways.  They instill in students and staff techniques to foster positive meaning of the social and personal issues dealt with in school and society.

Gay, L. (2009) has generated a guide to helping school safety/climate and fostering positive interpersonal relationships through "The Safe Space Kit".  This tool helps teachers create a safe space for LGBT students.  One of the most effective ways for an educator to create a safe space is to be a supportive ally to LGBT students.  This kit has numerous tools for teachers and schools to utilize to help transgender youth, including: a hard copy of "The Safe Space Kit" includes the "Guide to Being an Ally", stickers and two Safe Space posters.  Even utilizing something just to promote awareness, such as using "The Safe Space Kit" could be a good first step for schools to promote responsiveness to LGBT students.  Providing some supports rather than none at all can benefit LGBT youth tremendously now and in the future (Greytak, et al. 2013).

OBPP (Olweus Bullying Prevention Program)
OBPP is an anti-bullying program designed by psychologist Dan Olweus utilized in schools in Europe, Canada and the U.S. Reductions in bullying were due to parent training, playground supervision, home-school communication, classroom rules, and training videos.  Furthermore, Swearer, et al. (2010) discuss a "dosage effect" in which the more positive and consistent elements included in a program, the more the likelihood that bullying would decrease.  Success in one school does not guarantee success in another because each school has its own social climate.  The OBPP is effective but still needs to be analyzed further, since there are many things to consider when implementing this technique within a large school.

Steps To Respect
Steps To Respect is an anti-bullying campaign which can be beneficial in schools as well – it is a comprehensive guide for teachers, administrators, and students utilizing in class lessons and training helping schools foster positive social-emotional skills and conflict resolution.  If schools are able to change peer conduct and norms, increase student communication skills, and maintain adult prevention and intervention efforts, the positive effects of their work will strengthen over time (Frey, Edstrom & Hirschstein 2005) and continue to grow as each class progresses through the school system.

See also

Depression in childhood and adolescence
Healthcare and the LGBT community
LGBT health disparities
LGBT Mormon suicides
LGBT youth vulnerability
List of suicides that have been attributed to bullying
Sex and gender in suicide
Suicide ideation in South Korean LGBT youth
The Yogyakarta Principles

References

Further reading
 
 Cover, R. (2012). Queer Youth Suicide, Culture and Identity: Unliveable Lives? Ashgate, .
 
 

 
 
 
 
 
 Best Practices: Creating an LGBT-inclusive School Climate. (n.d.). Retrieved July 24, 2016, from http://www.tolerance.org/lgbt-best-practices

Homophobia
LGBT youth
LGBT and education
Sexual orientation and psychology
LGBT and society
Youth health
LGBT and suicide